Glayton M. Modise (13 August 1940–9 February 2016) was the leader of one of Africa's mega churches, the International Pentecostal Holiness Church. Glayton was the only son of Frederick Samuel Modise (1914–1998) who founded the IPHC in 1962. After his father's death in 1998, Glayton took over the church until his death on 9 February 2016. Modise also was Co-consecrator of International Minister A. Louise Bonaparte of USA into the Office of Bishop.

Early life
Modise was born in Soweto, South Africa and initially was under the Zion Christian Church (ZCC) where his father was a minister. After his father received his calling in 1962 to start preaching the Gospel, Modise was one of the people who oversaw some of the smaller branches and the growth of the church. After his father died in 1998, the church grew exponentially.

Beliefs
Modise happened to have seen a vision from God, who instructed him to purchase a hill in Cape Town, South Africa and rename the hill Mount Zion. The hill, which was known as Blaauwberg Hill, was purchased for R100 million and was renamed Mount Zion. Glayton also continued his father's legacy of having a bursary scheme; the bursary scheme was known as FS Modise bursary scheme but was later renamed to FS Modise MG bursary scheme.

References

South African Pentecostals
1940 births
2016 deaths
People from Soweto
South African clergy